Ozolin is a Russified form of the Latvian language surname Ozoliņš. Individuals with the surname include:

Edvin Ozolin (born 1939), Soviet sprinter and coach
Nikolay Ozolin (1906–2000), Russian pole vaulter

See also
Ozoliņš

Russian-language surnames
Surnames of Latvian origin